David Lehre (born August 8, 1985), also known as Chad Future, is an American actor, director, singer, and television host. He is known for directing various films, such as  Myspace: The Movie (2006). He has also appeared in several television series and films such as Epic Movie. He has released 2 studio album EPs in English and Korean, featuring well-known K-Pop artists such as Ha Sung-woon, Aron, and Ravi.

Early life
Lehre grew up in the neighborhood of Washington, Michigan in the Metro Detroit area, with Italian heritage.

Lehre credits his high school theatre classes as the catalyst for starting his career. He began making films after he and his friends were denied parts in their high school production of Little Women.

Career

Acting and filmmaking

On January 28, 2006, Lehre uploaded Myspace: The Movie, a parody of the popular social networking site that he directed, co-wrote, edited, scored, and starred in. Three days after Lehre uploaded the video to his personal site, another user uploaded the video to YouTube. By February 2006, Myspace: The Movie became YouTube's most viewed video at 3.4 million views. The film movie also began airing on rotation on Current TV, which reached 20 million U.S. homes.

In 2007, Lehre co-starred in the film Epic Movie.

In 2009, Lehre starred as Shamus Bryce in the sci-fi short Turbo, alongside Justin Chon. Lehre appeared in several films, commercials, and music videos. 

In 2011, Lehre also worked as an interviewer for MTV’s coverage of Billboard Korea’s KPOP Masters event.

In 2021, Lehre’s short film The Newscaster was featured in the My RØDE Reel short film competition.

Music

Heart2Heart
In 2011, Lehre, performing under the name Chad Future, formed the 5-member musical group Heart2Heart. The group was heavily influenced by the K-Pop boy band structure, with an assigned leader and each member fulfilling a specific role. It and consisted of members Chad Future, Pretty Boi Pete, KX, Nico, and Brayden.

Former N*SYNC member Lance Bass mentored the group and made a cameo in their debut music video. Lehre became friends with Bass while hosting the American Music Awards red carpet pre-show together in 2010.

The music video for Heart2Heart's debut single "Facebook Official" was directed by Lehre.

Chad Future
Inspired by his interest in K-Pop and American pop music, Lehre officially announced his solo music project under the stage name Chad Future in 2012, with a goal to bridge the gap between the genres. He chose the stage name Chad Future because he was nicknamed Chad while doing character work in high school theater.

Chad Future began creating English covers of popular K-pop songs by artists such as EXO, BigBang, and B.A.P., which received attention from fans and some of the actual artists.

Chad Future's English remix of BigBang's "Loser", which also featured American recording artist Preston Knight, was chosen as the winner of YG Entertainment's Made Series M cover competition.

Chad Future performed at the first KCON in 2012, and made his official debut on M-Net's M Countdown in Los Angeles on August 25, 2013.

He released The First Mini Album in 2014, a 5-song EP which featured collaborations with K-Pop recording artists VIXX's Ravi and NU'EST's Aron.

Chad Future's first television special "I Am Chad Future" aired on Mnet America in 2014, which documented the creation of his first album and the preparation of his M Countdown performance. In addition to being the title star, he also produced and edited the special.

In 2015, exactly one year after releasing his first mini album, Future, Lehre released his 2nd mini album, titled AK-Pop, which included 5 songs and collaborations with artists such as Ha Sung-woon and Bestie's U.JI. Both American and Korean artists, including Shin Hyuk, participated in its production.

In 2016, he directed, executive produced, and starred in Chad Future TV, which premiered on The Audience Network channel as a documentary series, also airing on AT&T U-Verse, DirecTV, and Fullscreen. Chad Future TV followed his first journey to Seoul, South Korea, where he collaborated with and interviewed K-Pop artists and went on several cultural adventures around the country.

Filmography

Short films

Television

Acting roles

Discography

Extended plays

References

Living people
1988 births
American K-pop singers
Korean-language singers of the United States